Typhoon Lee (born 1948) is an astrophysicist and geochemist at Academia Sinica, Taiwan, where he specializes in isotope geochemistry and nuclear astrophysics .

Lee received his Ph.D. in astronomy at the University of Texas in 1977.

His honors include the Robert J. Trumpler Award in 1978 from the Astronomical Society of the Pacific, and Outstanding Researcher Awards from the National Science Council in 1985-87 and 1988–90.

A selection of his publications includes:

X-wind, Refractory IDPs and Cometary Nuclei, 1999, in  Proc. IAU Colloquium 168, Astro. Soc. Pacific, San Francisco. 
Proto-stellar Cosmic Rays and Extinct Radioactivities in Meteorites, 1998, Ap. J. 506, 898–912. 
Coral Sr/Ca as a High Precision High Time-Resolution Paleo Thermometer for Sea Surface Temperature: Looking for ENSO Effects in Kuroshio near Taiwan, 1996, Proc. 1995 Nagoya ICBP-PAGES/PEP-II Symposium, 211–216. 
U-Disequilibrium Dating of Corals in Southern Taiwan by Mass Spectrometry, 1993, J. Geol. Soc. China. 36, 57–66. 
Model-Dependent Be-10 Sedimentation Rates for the Taiwan Strait and their Tectonic Significance, 1993, Geology, 21, 423–426. 
First Detection of Fallout Cs-135 and Potential Application of 137Cs/135Cs, 1993, Geochim. Cosmochim. Acta(Letters), 57, 3493–3497.

External links
Typhoon Lee personal website

Taiwanese astronomers
Planetary scientists
National Tsing Hua University alumni
University of Texas at Austin College of Natural Sciences alumni
Living people
Members of Academia Sinica
Taiwanese geochemists
1948 births